Milton is a home rule-class city along the south bank of the Ohio River in Trimble County, Kentucky, United States. The population was 597 at the time of the 2020 Census, making it the largest city in Trimble County.

It was part of the setting for the 1958 film Some Came Running starring Frank Sinatra, Dean Martin, and Shirley MacLaine.

History
Milton was settled in 1785 and founded in 1789, at which time it was still part of Virginia. A ferry with Madison, Indiana, on the opposite side of the Ohio began service in 1804. A bridge connecting them was constructed in 1929.

One of Milton's earliest newspapers, the Milton Free Press, was established in 1879 by Lewis P. Sarlls.

The city has endured many floods and most of its riverside downtown has been repeatedly destroyed, leaving little historic architecture. Some exceptions are Ginn's Furniture Store, Rowlett's Grocery, and County General Store, all of which are located on Main Street.

Milton was hit by a tornado on March 2, 2012. The Milton Fire and Rescue firehouse #2 was destroyed.

Geography 
Milton is located at  (38.7095, -85.3742).

Demographics 

As of the census of 2000, there were 525 people, 233 households, and 143 families residing in the city. The racial makeup of the city was 98.29% White, 0.19% Native American, 0.19% Asian, 0.57% from other races, and 0.76% from two or more races. Hispanic or Latino of any race were 0.95% of the population.

There were 233 households, out of which 26.6% had children under the age of 18 living with them, 50.2% were married couples living together, 6.9% had a female householder with no husband present, and 38.2% were non-families. 31.8% of all households were made up of individuals, and 18.0% had someone living alone who was 65 years of age or older. The average household size was 2.25 and the average family size was 2.84.

In the city, the population was spread out, with 19.4% under the age of 18, 10.7% from 18 to 24, 25.7% from 25 to 44, 25.0% from 45 to 64, and 19.2% who were 65 years of age or older. The median age was 41 years. For every 100 females, there were 81.0 males. For every 100 females age 18 and over, there were 83.9 males.

The median income for a household in the city was $23,250, and the median income for a family was $34,688. Males had a median income of $27,500 versus $14,875 for females. The per capita income for the city was $13,264. About 12.2% of families and 19.6% of the population were below the poverty line, including 19.3% of those under age 18 and 22.5% of those age 65 or over.

Climate
The climate in this area is characterized by hot, humid summers and generally mild to cool winters. According to the Köppen Climate Classification system, Milton has a humid subtropical climate, abbreviated "Cfa" on climate maps.

Notable person
 Sondra Rodgers, actress, was born in Milton

See also 
 List of cities and towns along the Ohio River
 Tornado outbreak of March 2–3, 2012

References

External links 
 City of Milton, Kentucky Homepage
 Milton Fire and Rescue

Cities in Kentucky
Cities in Trimble County, Kentucky
Louisville metropolitan area
Kentucky populated places on the Ohio River